The 59th Venice Biennale is an international contemporary art exhibition to be held between April and November 2022. The Venice Biennale takes place biennially in Venice, Italy, and participating nations select artists to show at their pavilions, hosted in the Venice Giardini, Arsenale, and palazzos throughout the city. The 2019 Venice Biennale's 90 national pavilions was a record for national participation.

National pavilions

References

Further reading 

 

National pavilions
Venice Biennale exhibitions